Grey Dog Software is a computer games development company, based in Phoenix, Arizona, and specializing in sports text simulations. Notable games released by Grey Dog include the Total Extreme Wrestling series and the Wrestling Spirit series.

History 

On September 7, 2004, Arlie Rahn founded Grey Dog. Gary Gorski and Adam Ryland came to the company with Rahn.

All three developers had worked under the same company, .400 Software Studios, but when that company dissolved due to an ownership dispute, the three developers formed Grey Dog Software under the ownership of Rahn.

Gorski left Grey Dog in May 2006 to create his own company, Wolverine Studios.

Brian Nichols joined the company in December 2006 in order to be the lead developer of the basketball product line.

Games Released 

 Arcadia: Guild of Heroes
 Bowl Bound College Football
 Comic Book Hero: The Greatest Cape
 Fast Break College Basketball
 Fast Break Pro Basketball
 Fast Break Pro Basketball 2
 Fast Break Pro Basketball 2013
 Imperium: Arena of Death
 Total Extreme Wrestling 2005
 Total Extreme Wrestling 2007
 Total Extreme Wrestling 2008
 Total Extreme Wrestling 2010
 Total Extreme Wrestling 2013
 Total Extreme Wrestling 2016
 Total Extreme Wrestling 2020
 World of Mixed Martial Arts
 World of Mixed Martial Arts 2
 World of Mixed Martial Arts 3
 World of Mixed Martial Arts 4
 World of Mixed Martial Arts 5
 Wrestling Spirit
 Wrestling Spirit 2
 Wrestling Spirit 3

Developers 

Products are categorized into product lines: basketball, football, wrestling/MMA and other.

References

External links 
Grey Dog Software Official Site

Video game development companies
Video game companies of the United States